The 2016–17 San Diego State Aztecs women's basketball team represents San Diego State University in the 2016–17 NCAA Division I women's basketball season. The Aztecs, led by fourth year head coach Stacie Terry. The Aztecs played their home games at the Viejas Arena and were members of the Mountain West Conference. They finished the season 11–19, 6–12 in Mountain West play to finish in ninth place. They lost in the first round of the Mountain West women's tournament to San Jose State.

Roster

Schedule

|-
!colspan=9 style="background:#C23038; color:#231F20;"| Exhibition

|-
!colspan=9 style="background:#C23038; color:#231F20;"| Non-conference regular season

|-
!colspan=9 style="background:#C23038; color:#231F20;"| Mountain West regular season

|-
!colspan=9 style="background:#C23038; color:#231F20;"| Mountain West Women's Tournament

See also
2016–17 San Diego State Aztecs men's basketball team

References

San Diego State
San Diego State Aztecs women's basketball seasons
San Diego State
San Diego State